Stuart William Boam (born 28 January 1948) is an English retired footballer and manager who is probably best known for his eight-year spell with Middlesbrough.

Boam grew up in Kirkby-in-Ashfield, Nottinghamshire, and began his career at his local club Mansfield Town where he signed a professional contract in July 1966, and made his first-team debut against Leyton Orient on 12 May 1967, the final day of the 1966–67 season.

The following season, 19-year-old Boam established himself as a regular in the heart of Mansfield's defence, and was ever-present in the team in both the 1968–69 and 1969–70 seasons. On 26 February 1969, he was a member of the Mansfield team that made national headlines with a shock 3–0 win against West Ham United in the fifth round of the FA Cup.

Boam's consistent performances for Mansfield eventually caught the eye of bigger clubs, and in June 1971 he was sold to Middlesbrough for £50,000. He was immediately placed in Boro's starting lineup, and was named team captain ahead of the 1973–74 season, when Middlesbrough won the Second Division title. In eight years at Ayresome Park, Boam played nearly 400 games for Middlesbrough, and was rarely out of the side.

His association with Middlesbrough came to an end in August 1979, when he was sold to North East rivals Newcastle United for £170,000. In July 1981, Boam returned to Mansfield, where he was named player-manager. However, a back injury restricted his playing role to a handful of appearances, and as manager he failed to get the expected results, finishing fifth from bottom of Division Four in his only full season in charge. He was sacked as manager in January 1983, and finished his career with a short spell at Hartlepool United.

He found relative fame being mentioned in the Half Man Half Biscuit song 'Bladderwrack Allowance'.

References

1948 births
Living people
English footballers
English football managers
Mansfield Town F.C. players
Middlesbrough F.C. players
Newcastle United F.C. players
Hartlepool United F.C. players
Mansfield Town F.C. managers
People from Kirkby-in-Ashfield
Footballers from Nottinghamshire
Association football central defenders